The Alabama Renaissance Faire is a Renaissance fair held annually in downtown Florence, Alabama on the fourth full weekend in October each year.

History
The Alabama Renaissance Faire was created in 1987 by a group of educators and city leaders meeting over the summer.  The proposed fairs' purpose was twofold: ..."1) to create a festival that would occur during the school year; and 2) to make sure that the event would include as many subjects within the area schools’ curricular offerings as possible..."  Because the city of Florence, Italy was one of the centers of the historic Renaissance period — as well as the city's namesake — the organizers thought that would be the perfect theme for their education-focused fair.  They held the first small fair that October.  The Alabama Renaissance Faire has been a celebration of Florence's "Renaissance City" identity since then.  The following year, the state of Alabama's senate and house passed a bill that designated Florence as the state's official renaissance fair city.

Details
The Faire is held in the city's Wilson Park, renamed 'Fountain-on-the-Green' for the event, and averages between 30 and 40,000 participants every year.  Elements of the fare and activities that take place during the fair have expanded from the original plans.  They now include magic performers, historical event reenactments, arts & crafts workshops, food, beverage, and merchandise vendors, costume-making workshops, elementary school art contests, song-writing contests, and musical performances.  The fair takes place yearly on the fourth weekend in October.  

The Alabama Renaissance Faire is run by a non-profit, all volunteer, group known as the "Roundtable."  There are no admission fees to the public to attend the fair.  The Faire is unique in that the event's figurehead, or 'Monarch,' rotates every year and is chosen by the organizers at the Renaissance Feast that precedes the faire by one week. The monarch decides the theme for the faire for that year, and is permitted to leave the throne in whatever fashion they decide.

No faire was held in 2020 due to the COVID-19 pandemic.

See also 
 List of Renaissance fairs

References

External links

State Symbols USA

Festivals in Alabama
Tourist attractions in Lauderdale County, Alabama
Renaissance fairs